Samuel Clark Jenkins is an American politician who served as a Democratic member of the North Carolina General Assembly representing the state's third Senate district from 2003 to 2015. His district included constituents in Edgecombe, Martin, and Pitt counties. Jenkins is a farmer from Tarboro, North Carolina.  Jenkins served six terms and was Deputy Minority Leader of the NC Senate.

References

External links
North Carolina General Assembly - Senator Clark Jenkins official NC Senate website
Project Vote Smart - Senator Clark Jenkins (NC) profile
Follow the Money - Clark Jenkins
2008 2006 2004 2002 campaign contributions

North Carolina state senators
Living people
1948 births
21st-century American politicians